Aisha Khatoon is a Pakistani politician who had been a Member of the Provincial Assembly of Sindh, from June 2013 to May 2018.

Early life and education
She was born on 1 January 1950 in Banaras, India.

She earned the degree of the Bachelor of Arts from the University of Karachi.

Political career

She was elected to the Provincial Assembly of Sindh as a candidate of Muttahida Qaumi Movement on a reserved seat for women in 2013 Pakistani general election.

References

Living people
Sindh MPAs 2013–2018
1950 births
Muttahida Qaumi Movement politicians